Rags to Riches is a 1941 American crime film directed by Joseph Kane and written by James R. Webb. The film stars Alan Baxter, Mary Carlisle, Jerome Cowan, Adrian Morris, Ralf Harolde and Paul Porcasi. The film was released on July 31, 1941, by Republic Pictures.

Plot

Cast 
Alan Baxter as Jimmy Rogers
Mary Carlisle as Carol Patrick
Jerome Cowan as Marshall Abbott
Adrian Morris as Bickford 
Ralf Harolde as Slip Conlan
Paul Porcasi as Professor Del Rio
Suzanne Kaaren as Glenda Hayes
Eddie Acuff as Ace
Rosina Galli as Maria
Charles Trowbridge as Prosecutor
Daisy Lee Mothershed as Julia
Joan Blair as Belle Cassidy
Francis Sayles as Bert Cassidy

References

External links
 

1941 films
American crime films
1941 crime films
Republic Pictures films
Films directed by Joseph Kane
American black-and-white films
1940s English-language films
1940s American films